The 2015 Men's Youth World Handball Championship was the sixth edition of the IHF Men's Youth World Championship, held in Yekaterinburg, Russia from 7 to 20 August 2015. France won their first title by defeating Slovenia 33–26 in the final.

Qualified teams
The Oceania Federation withdrew, Serbia was named the replacement.

Europe

 (Host)

Africa

America

Asia

Preliminary round
The draw was held on 13 May 2015.

All times are local (UTC+5).

Group A

Group B

Group C

Group D

Knockout stage

5th place bracket

Round of 16

Quarterfinals

5th–8th place semifinals

Semifinals

Seventh place game

Fifth place game

Third place game

Final

9–16th placement games
The eight losers of the round of 16 were seeded according to their results in the preliminary round against teams ranked 1–4 and played an elimination game to determine their final position.

Ranking

15th place game

13th place game

Eleventh place game

Ninth place game

President's Cup
17th place bracket

21st place bracket

21st–24th place semifinals

17th–20th place semifinals

23rd place game

21st place game

19th place game

17th place game

Final standings

Awards

MVP
Right-back:

All-star team
Goalkeeper: 
Right wing: 
Right back: 
Centre back: 
Left back: 
Left wing: 
Pivot:

References

External links
Official website
IHF Site

2015 Youth
Men's Youth World Handball Championship
Men's Youth World Handball Championship
2015 Men's Youth World Handball Championship
2015 Men's Youth World Handball Championship